Justin McNulty MLA (born 15 November 1974) is an Irish Social Democratic and Labour Party (SDLP) politician, a former Gaelic football manager, and a former player at senior level for the Armagh county team. He has sat in the Northern Ireland Assembly since 2016 as a Member of the Legislative Assembly (MLA) for Newry and Armagh.

McNulty played football for the Mullaghbawn Cúchullain's club in Armagh and also played at senior level for the Armagh county team from 1995 to 2005. He won an All-Ireland Senior Football Championship (SFC) medal in 2002 while playing in the full-back position.

Sporting career
The Lislea-born, McNulty played for Mullaghbawn alongside his twin brother Paul and their younger brother, Enda. Justin made his senior inter-county debut for Armagh in 1995 in a league game against Louth. He won 5 Ulster SFC medals and won an All-Ireland SFC medal when Armagh defeated Kerry by a scoreline of 1–12 to 0–14 in the 2002 All-Ireland Senior Football Championship Final. In 2005 McNulty retired from inter-county football. Management followed soon after and Justin led Mullahoran Dreadnoughts of Cavan to a Senior Championship in 2006.

The following year Justin managed St Brigid's GAA (Dublin), who was narrowly beaten in the 2007 Dublin County Final by St Vincent's who went on to win the All Ireland. In late 2009 he was appointed as an Armagh selector under the management of Paddy O'Rourke.

In August 2010, after Seán Dempsey resigned as Laois manager, McNulty was appointed as his successor. McNulty's first season proved a success as Laois gained promotion to the top tier of the National Football League, despite losing the league decider to Donegal. McNulty left Laois in August 2013.

Political career
McNulty contested his home constituency of Newry and Armagh for the SDLP in the 2015 general election. Despite losing to Sinn Féin candidate Mickey Brady, McNulty polled 12,026 votes, a 24.1% share which represented a 1500 vote increase on the previous election. McNulty was elected to the 6th Northern Irish Assembly on 3 March 2017 for the SDLP. In the General election of 2017, McNulty saw his share of the vote drop to 16.9% Newry and Armagh with his Sinn Féin rivals vote increasing by 6.8%.In the Assesembly election of May 2022, McNulty's vote share fell further to 10.8%. The impact of independent candidate Gavin Malone standing in the election, appears to have both candidates fighting for the same share of the vote in the Newry area.

References

1974 births
Living people
Armagh county football team
Armagh inter-county Gaelic footballers
Gaelic football backs
Gaelic football managers
Gaelic football selectors
Irish sportsperson-politicians
Mullaghbawn Gaelic footballers
Politicians from County Armagh
Sportspeople from County Armagh
Northern Ireland MLAs 2016–2017
Northern Ireland MLAs 2017–2022
Northern Ireland MLAs 2022–2027
Social Democratic and Labour Party MLAs
Winners of one All-Ireland medal (Gaelic football)